Calpocalyx heitzii is a species of flowering plant in the family Fabaceae. It is found in Cameroon, Equatorial Guinea, and Gabon. It is threatened by habitat loss.

References

Mimosoids
Flora of Cameroon
Flora of Gabon
Flora of Equatorial Guinea
Vulnerable plants
Taxonomy articles created by Polbot
Taxa named by François Pellegrin